Grigor Dimitrov was the defending champion, but lost in the semifinals to Nick Kyrgios.

Kyrgios went on to win the title, defeating Ryan Harrison in the final, 6–4, 6–2.

Seeds
The top four seeds receive a bye into the second round.

Draw

Finals

Top half

Bottom half

Qualifying

Seeds

Qualifiers

Lucky loser
  Yannick Hanfmann

Qualifying draw

First qualifier

Second qualifier

Third qualifier

Fourth qualifier

References
 Main Draw
 Qualifying Draw

Men's Singles
2018 ATP World Tour